The 2011 College Basketball Invitational (CBI) was a single-elimination tournament of 16 NCAA Division I teams that did not participate in the 2011 NCAA Tournament nor the 2011 National Invitation Tournament. The opening round began Tuesday, March 15. A best-of-three championship series between the two teams in the final was held on March 28, March 30, and April 1.

The tournament was won by Oregon who defeated Creighton in the finals after losing game one but winning the next two games at home to claim the title. This was the second time that the tournament was won by a team from the Pacific-10 Conference who entered the tournament with a losing record (Oregon State, 2009).

Coach Dana Altman, who was in his first year at Oregon, coached at Creighton the year before.

Participants

Bracket

During the finals, Oregon hosted games 2 and 3.

References

College Basketball Invitational
College Basketball Invitational